The 2005 season will  be best remembered for Lance Armstrong's unparalleled seventh successive victory in the Tour de France, however it was also notable for other reasons.  After months of wrangling between the UCI, teams, and organizers of the major tours, the ProTour finally became a reality.

Elite Men

January

February

March

April

May

June

July

August

September

October

November – December 

No major races.

Final rankings

ProTour

Continental Circuits

See also 

 Road bicycle racing
 UCI Continental Circuits
 UCI ProTour
 List of men's road bicycle races

References

External links 
 Cyclingnews.com Road Calendar 2005
 Giro d'Italia 
 Tour de France 
 UCI ProTour 
 UCI World Road Championships 
 Union Cycliste Internationale 
 Vuelta a España 

 
Men's road cycling by year